Cypriot euro coins feature three separate designs for the three series of coins. Cyprus has been a member of the European Union since 1 May 2004, and is a member of the Economic and Monetary Union of the European Union. It has completed the third stage of the EMU and adopted  the euro as its official currency on 1 January 2008.

Cypriot euro design
For images of the common side and a detailed description of the coins, see euro coins.

Circulating Mintage quantities
The following table shows the mintage quantity for all Cypriot euro coins, per denomination, per year.

Mints
2008-20: Finland
2010-2018: Greece

Identifying marks

Design selection process
The official public contest for the design of the Cypriot euro coins, which ended on 14 October 2005, defined what the required motifs of the respective coins should encompass:

 1 cent, 2 cent and 5 cent: The mouflon, the most characteristic species of fauna in Cyprus, representing the island's nature and wildlife.
 10 cent, 20 cent and 50 cent: The ancient Greek Kyrenia ship of 4th Century B.C., representing Cyprus's history and its character as an island as well as its importance in trade.
 €1 and €2: The Idol of Pomos, a cross-shaped idol dating back to the Cypriot chalcolithic period (3000 B.C.), found in Pomos, a village in the district of Paphos.  It is a characteristic example of prehistoric art in Cyprus, representing the island's antiquity, culture and civilization.

American artist Erik Maell and Greek artist Tatiana Soteropoulos were chosen by the Central Bank of Cyprus to create and illustrate the designs to be used for the final coins.
The artists were instructed to include the name of Cyprus in Greek and Turkish, that is, ΚΥΠΡΟΣ (Kypros) and KIBRIS in the design for the coins.

Euro adoption
On 11 October 2006, the final designs of the Cypriot euro coins were presented at the exhibition "Από τη Λίρα στο Ευρώ" ("From the Pound to the Euro") of the Central Bank of Cyprus about the history of currency in Cyprus. They do not appear to include "Cyprus" in English, as demanded by the revised competition rules, but instead only in the state's two official languages, Greek and Turkish.

On 13 February 2007, the Republic of Cyprus formally applied to join the eurozone on 1 January 2008. The final decision was expected to be taken in Brussels on 21–22 June at an EU Summit to be ratified by all EU heads of state.

On 9 March 2007, the campaign to inform the citizens of Cyprus about the euro officially began in Cypriot media.

On 15 March 2007, the House of Representatives passed the necessary laws for the introduction of the euro on 1 January 2008.

On 16 May 2007, the Commissioner for Economic & Financial Affairs of the EU, Joaquín Almunia, recommended that Cyprus adopt the euro as scheduled.

On 20 June 2007, the European Parliament voted affirmatively on this issue and on 21 June 2007, the date was confirmed by the EU leaders.

On 10 July 2007, the EU Finance Ministers set the permanent exchange rate to CYP 0.585274 to 1 euro.

On 23 October 2007, the designs were officially published in the Official Journal of the European Union.

On 1 January 2008, the euro replaced the Cypriot pound as the official currency.

€2 commemorative coins

Other commemorative coins (Collectors' coins)

Although Cyprus joined the Eurozone in 2008, they already had one high value commemorative coin, minted in silver.  This coin was minted as a legacy of an old national practice of minting gold and silver coins.  This coin is not really intended to be used as means of payment, so generally they do not circulate.

See also

 Cyprus in the European Union

References

External links

Website of the Central Bank of Cyprus with the final national designs. (Click on the name of each denomination to see the respective design)
 Website for the Euro from the Republic of Cyprus
European Central Bank – Cyprus
 Cyprus euro coins and commemorative 2€ coins

Euro coins by issuing country
Euro coins
Euro